Amirpur Halt Railway Station is located in Pakistan.

See also
 List of railway stations in Pakistan
 Pakistan Railways

References

Railway stations in Toba Tek Singh District
Railway stations on Khanewal–Wazirabad Line